Walter James may also refer to:

 Walter James (actor) (1882–1946), American film actor
 Walter James (Australian politician) (1863–1943), Australian politician and the fifth Premier of Western Australia
 Walter James, 1st Baron Northbourne (1816–1893), British peer and Tory Member of Parliament
 Walter James, 2nd Baron Northbourne (1846–1923), British peer and Liberal Member of Parliament
 Walter James, 3rd Baron Northbourne, English painter, etcher, and hereditary peer
 Walter James, 4th Baron Northbourne (1896–1982), British peer, agriculturalist, Olympic rower and Traditionalist author
 Arthur Walter James (1912–2015), British journalist and politician
 Walter James, a character in Dirty Work, a 1988 novel by Larry Brown

See also